

Wulfgar (died ) was a medieval Bishop of Lichfield.

Wulfgar was consecrated between 935 and 941 and died between 946 and 949. He is known to history from William of Malmesbury, a number of royal charters, some land grants made by him and as witness in several assorted contractual documents from the 10th century.

Citations

References

External links
 

10th-century English bishops
Anglo-Saxon bishops of Lichfield
940s deaths
Year of birth unknown
Year of death uncertain